This list covers the railway stations in the Berlin area. These include both passenger stations and marshalling yards, but not goods stations. Because the Berlin S-Bahn network has expanded to include stations in the state of Brandenburg, the table shows only those stations lying within the Verkehrsverbund Berlin-Brandenburg's present-day Berlin ABC fare zones (i.e. those up to about 15 kilometres from the Berlin city boundary), and those formerly served by Berlin's suburban services. The latter ran out beyond the capital's boundaries to the next largest towns along the main and branch lines.

The farthest towns on the lines covered here are listed below:

Rüdnitz (Stettin Railway) – Werneuchen (Wriezen Railway) – Strausberg (Prussian Eastern Railway) – Fürstenwalde (Lower Silesian-Märkisch Railway) – Kablow (Königs Wusterhausen–Grunow) – Königs Wusterhausen (Görlitz Railway) – Mittenwalde (Neukölln–Mittenwalde railway)  –  Wünsdorf (Dresden Railway) – Thyrow (Anhalt Railway) – Beelitz-Stadt (Brandenburg Ring Railway)  – Beelitz-Heilstätten (Wetzlar Railway) – Werder (Berlin-Potsdam railway (Stammbahn) – Wustermark (Lehrte Railway) – Nauen (Hamburg Railway) – Vehlefanz (Kremmen Railway) – Sachsenhausen (Nordb) (Prussian Northern Railway) – Wensickendorf and Wandlitzsee (Heidekraut Railway).

Overview 

In Berlin there are long-distance stations for rail travellers. The following stop at these stations:
	
 Deutsche Bahn AG trains:
 InterCityExpress (ICE)
 InterCity (IC)
 EuroCity (EC) and
 Trains of other railway companies:
 InterConneX (X) – (Veolia Verkehr)
 Harz-Elbe-Express (HEX) – (Veolia Verkehr)
 Berlin Night Express (Georg Verkehrsorganisation) (GVG)

There are also regional stations. The following call at these stations:

 Deutsche Bahn AG trains:
 RegionalExpresse (RE) and
 RegionalBahnen (RB)
 Trains of other railway companies:
 Niederbarnimer Eisenbahn (NE),
 Ostdeutsche Eisenbahn (OE),
 Märkische Regiobahn (MR) und
 Prignitzer Eisenbahn (PE).

The following stop at S-Bahn stations:

 S-Bahn Berlin GmbH trains
 Stadtschnellbahn trains (S-Bahn)

There are also two marshalling yards in the Berlin area.

Passenger stations 

The following table gives an overview of the current, former and planned railway stations and halts in the Berlin together with the associated district abbreviation (as used on car number plates) and the types of train that stop there. For readability only one example of the train category is given in the table.

 ICE for long-distance express trains, i.e. also TGV, Thalys etc.
 IC for special long-distance trains, i.e. Also private ones like InterConnex etc.
 RE for local express trains
 RB for regional trains, including those of private operators such as ODEG, UBB etc.
 S for S-Bahn trains
 x means that the train type (or a similar one) calls at the station
 x¹ means that the train type (or a similar one) used to call at the station
 For reasons of space only the car number plate abbreviation for the  town or rural district is given. These are:
 Berlin (B)
 Landkreis Barnim (BAR)
 Landkreis Dahme-Spreewald (LDS)
 Landkreis Havelland (HVL)
 Landkreis Märkisch-Oderland (MOL)
 Landkreis Oberhavel (OHV)
 Landkreis Oder-Spree (LOS)
 Potsdam (P)
 Landkreis Potsdam-Mittelmark (PM)
 Landkreis Teltow-Fläming (TF)

Marshalling yards

Operational facilities 

 Seddin (located outside the Berlin city area on the Wetzlar Railway south of Potsdam)
 Berlin Nordost (on the Outer Ring)
 Wustermark Rbf (formerly Berlin's largest marshalling yard, located outside the Berlin city area, closed in 2001, bought in 2008 by the Havelländische Eisenbahn (HVLE) and since 1 July 2008 used as a link line from the Rail & Logistik Center at Wustermark)

Closed facilities 

 Berlin Wuhlheide Rbf (1994 closed, demolished)
 Berlin-Tempelhof Rbf (1952 closed, demolished)
 Berlin-Pankow (1997 closed, partly demolished)
 Berlin-Lichtenberg (converted to a storage yard for passenger coaches)
 Berlin-Rummelsburg (converted to a storage yard for passenger coaches)
 Berlin-Niederschöneweide (1996 closed)

In addition, during the Second World War there were three supplementary marshalling yards (Hilfsrangierbahnhöfe) outside the political city boundaries:

 Rüdnitz
 Fredersdorf
 Großbeeren

See also 
 List of Berlin S-Bahn stations
 List of Berlin U-Bahn stations
 List of railway stations in Brandenburg
 List of scheduled railway routes in Germany
 List of closed railway lines in Brandenburg and Berlin

External links 

 Berlin S-Bahn stations
  

 
!
!
Railway stations
Rail
Berl